Adventures of Superman or The Adventures of Superman may refer to:

The Adventures of Superman (radio series), program of the 1940s
The Adventures of Superman (novel), written in 1942 by George Lowther
 Adventures of Superman (TV series), a 1951–1958 TV series starring George Reeves
The Adventures of Superman (comic book), published by DC Comics
The New Adventures of Superman (TV series), an animated series that aired from 1966 to 1970

See also 
Lois & Clark: The New Adventures of Superman, the 1990s TV series